The Seneschal of Poitou was an officer carrying out and managing the domestic affairs of the lord of the County of Poitou. During the course of the twelfth century, the seneschalship, also became an office of military command.

Originally, the seneschal managed the comital household, coordinating between the receivers of various landholdings and the chamber, treasury, and the chancellory or chapel. From 1138, the office was converted into that of a vice-regent governing the county in the absence of the count. In that year, King Louis VII of France, who had become count by marriage to the countess, Eleanor of Aquitaine, appointed the hereditary seneschal William de Mauzé to govern the county in his absence. The seneschals of Poitou, like those appointed in Normandy, Gascony, and Anjou had custody of demesne fortresses, the regional treasuries, and presidency of the highest court of regional custom.

List of Seneschals

William de Mauzé (1138)
Geoffrey de la Celle  (1201)
Savari de Mauléon (1205) - first appointment
Robert of Thornham (1207)
Hubert de Burgh (1212–?)
Geoffrey de Neville (1215)
Reginald of Pons (1215–?)
Philip of Oldcoates (1220) - died while enroute
Savari de Mauléon (1220?) - second appointment
Eustache de Beaumarchais (1268–1276)
Philippe de Rémi (1284-1287)
Jean de Lille (1349)
William Felton (1360)
John Chandos (1369)

Notes

References
 Warren, W.L.; Henry II (English Monarchs)

12th century in France
13th century in France
Historical legal occupations
Legal history of France